Oleksandr Ihorovych Bondarenko (born 28 July 1989) is a professional Ukrainian football midfielder who played for FC Volyn Lutsk in the Ukrainian First League.

Oleksandr Bondarenko is a product of the FC Obolon Kyiv football academy. He became noticeable in 2015 averaging a goal per game after the first eight rounds of the 2015–16 season in the Ukrainian Second League with whom the newly promoted Kolos secured leading positions in the league.

External links
 
 
 Oleksandr Bondarenko at UA-Football 
 
 

1989 births
Living people
Footballers from Kyiv
Ukrainian footballers
FC Obolon-Brovar Kyiv players
FC Nyva Vinnytsia players
FC Kolos Kovalivka players
Csákvári TK players
FC Volyn Lutsk players
Ukrainian Premier League players
Ukrainian First League players
Ukrainian Second League players
Ukrainian expatriate footballers
Expatriate footballers in Hungary
Ukrainian expatriate sportspeople in Hungary
Association football forwards